The AACTA Award for Best Feature Length Documentary, is a non-feature film award presented by the Australian Academy of Cinema and Television Arts (AACTA) to an Australian documentary that is longer than sixty minutes in duration and "is a creative treatment of actuality other than a news, current affairs, sports coverage, magazine, infotainment or light entertainment program. Prior to the establishment of the Academy in 2011, the award was presented by the Australian Film Institute (AFI) at the annual Australian Film Institute Awards (more commonly known as the AFI Awards) from 2009–2010. A single award for Best Documentary was handed out from 1958–2008, before it was split into three categories: Best Feature Length Documentary, Best Documentary Under One Hour and Best Documentary Series. The award is presented at the AACTA Awards Luncheon, a black tie event which celebrates achievements in film production, television, documentaries and short films.

Winners and nominees
In the following table, winners are listed first, in boldface and highlighted in gold; those listed below the winner that are not in boldface or highlighted are the nominees.

AFI Awards (2008-2010)

AACTA Awards (2012)

See also
AACTA Awards

References

External links
The Australian Academy of Cinema and Television Arts Official website

Awards established in 2009
Documentary
Documentary film awards